Kadavu Province is one of fourteen provinces of Fiji, and forms part of the Eastern Division, which also includes the provinces of Lau, Lomaiviti and Rotuma. Kadavu also belongs to the Burebasaga Confederacy, a hierarchy of chiefs from southern and western Fiji with Roko Tui Dreketi of Rewa as the paramount chief.

It consists of Kadavu Island, Ono Island, Galoa Island, Dravuni Island, Matanuku Island, Buliya Island, Nagigia Island, and a few other islands. Kadavu has a total land area of 408 square kilometers, with a population of 10,897 at the most recent census in 2017, making it the fourth least populous province.

The Kadavu group is volcanic in nature, the main island being Kadavu, which is 93 km long and varies in width from several hundred metres to 13 km, All its coasts are deeply indented, some bays biting so far into the land that they almost divide the island. One geographer has suggested that the shape of Kadavu resembles that of a wasp, with the head, thorax and abdomen linked by narrow waists.

Thus Vunisea (the administrative center), Namalata Bay and Galoa Harbor are separated by only a sandy isthmus standing a few meters above sea level; and at Vunisei the heads of Daku Bay and Soso Bay are within 1100 meters of each other, with only a low ridge between.

The province is divided into nine  (districts), each with its own paramount chief and chiefly villages. The  are Tavuki (Tavuki), Naceva (Soso), Nabukelevu (Daviqele), Nakasaleka (Nakoronawa), Sanima (Drue), Yale (Rakiraki), Yawe (Nalotu), Ono (Vabea) and Ravitaki (Ravitaki). Each high chief is a member of the Kadavu Provincial Council. There are 75 villages in the province of Kadavu.

The Kadavu dialects are almost as numerous as the  but with tiny variations between dialects. The Kadavu dialects are closer to the Rewa dialect in Ono and then closer to the Beqa, Serua and Vatulele dialect in the main island with more similarities with the Nadroga, Naitasiri and Ba dialects as one move towards the south of the island. This could all indicate the origin of the inhabitants to an extent.

Kadavu is also the home of the second-largest living organism on Earth, the Great Astrolabe Reef, which lies along the southern side of the island and stretches from the northern part of the island, Ono island, to the southern tip of Kadavu Island, Muanasika Point near Nasau village. The edges of this reef are indicated by two lighthouses: the Solo Light House near Ono Island, and the Washington Lighthouse close to Nagigia Island.

There is no town on the island but Vunisea is where all the government headquarters are, with one high school (boarding school), a primary school, police station, hospital, airstrip and at least five supermarkets. However, there are also two main other government stations apart from Vunisea: Kavala and Daviqele.

Noteworthy Kadavuans
 Akalaini Baravilala - first Fijian woman to play for World Rugby Women's Sevens Series USA Women's Sevens team and also represented USA at Rio Olympics, 2016.
 Bulou Akanisi Koroitamana - Former politician, wife of Ratu Jone Koroitamana
 Akuila Yabaki -  Fijian human rights activist and Methodist clergyman
 Alexander O' Connor - Politician, Current MP
 Alexander Sauvolitanakadavu Soqosoqo - Former sprint king, Actor, Soldier
 Apaitia Seru - former Attorney General, Minister for Justice and Chief Magistrate
 Apakuki CokanaKadavu - Songwriter, Musician
 Ana Naisoro - Fiji Police Force spokesperson
 Dee Uluirewa - singer Hillsong Australia, (Sister of Dr. Tim Uluirewa)
 Edward Soro - VOU Performance Manager/Coordinator
 Elenoa Sailosi - Former sprint queen, one of the most endearing athletes of Fiji
 Dr Epeli Nailatikau - Medical Doctor, father of Merewalesi Nailatikau
 Epeli Vakatawa - TV personality and host
 Emosi Mulevoro - IRB Sevens Rugby player
 Fenton Lutunatabua -Former TV host, Environmentalist, Pacific Climate Warrior Coordinator
Helena Young - Fastest teenager in the South Pacific-Upcoming Sprint queen (Best Female Athlete, Coca - Cola games, 2018)
 Rev. Inoke Nabulivou - Past President of the Methodist Church of Fiji and Rotuma
 Sir James Ah-Koy - KBE, Fijian businessman, politician, and diplomat
 James Bolabiu - first Fijian and First Pacific Islander to officiate international rugby sevens matches and Fiji's most experienced referee.
 Jesoni Vitusagavulu - Former CEO, Former Ambassador to the United States, Cuba, Mexico and High commissioner to China
 Jerry Yanuyanutawa - 15's rugby player, plays in the UK
 John O' Connor - CEO Fiji Rugby Union, Former CEO National Fire Authority
 John Seru -  Actor and former Australian professional wrestler. He is best known as "Vulcan" in the Australian version of TV series Gladiators
 Ratu Jone Naivaluvea Misikini - Supervising Magistrate 
 Josefa Lilidamu - Rugby player ( Japan.)
 Kaliopate Tavola - Former Minister for Foreign Affairs -  Fiji an Agricultural economist, diplomat, and politician, who was his country's Minister for Foreign Affairs from 2000 to 2006
 Konisi Yabaki  - Former Fijian politician
 Lenora Qereqeretabua - first daughter and mother to be crowned Miss Hibiscus. Longest serving TV personality in Fiji (20 yrs), former Hibiscus queen and one of the Pacific's most recognisable face. Fiji's favourite MC
 Leone Lesianawai - first Fijian to act in a TV series, "Adventures of the Seaspray." Fiji's most famous policeman with the Fijian "bui ni ga"
Leone Nakarawa - first Fijian and first Pacific Islander to win the "European Player of the Year" Award & the Anthony Foley Trophy, 2018.  "Gold medallist at Rio Olympics 2016",Known world wide as "Offloader King". Fiji's most versatile talent, & no 1 rugby superstar.
 Lingo Reece - Castaway Island Duty Manager for more than 26 years.
 Litia Daveta AKA Esther King - One of Fiji's most famous gospel singer.
 Lynda Tabuya - politician, Former Miss Hiscus, Former Lecturer.
Dr Manoa Masi - first Fijian dentist, one of the core influences behind the prominence of the Kadavu Choir
 Manu Korovulavula -  first father and son in Fiji and the Pacific to fight together in a war. Fijian political leader and civil servant. War veteran of the Malayan Campaign. Also a writer, composer, and singer.
 Merewalesi Nailatikau - first Fijian and first Melanesian woman to win the South Pacific Pageant. Was a recipient of a Sylff fellowship, was appointed UNICEF ambassador for the Pacific Island countries. Former TV personality. Former Miss Hibscus queen.
 Mosese Tikoitoga - Ambassador, Former RFMF Commander
 Mosese Sorovi - Fiji's Former Heavyweight Boxing Champion
 Niko Verekauta - Pacific Games Former 400 meters specialist & champion
 Nina Nawalowalo - first female Melanesian theatre director in the world. Daughter of Ratu Noa Nawalowalo.
 Ratu Noa Nawalowalo - first Fijian-born barrister to graduate from Victoria University and first Fijian to set up a law firm in NZ.
 Rachel Ah Koy - Former Swimming National record holder & champion, granddaughter of Sir James Ah Koy
 Radike Qereqeretabua - Long time Hotelier/Manager, father of Lenora Qereqeretabua
 Ratu Josateki Nawalowalo - was a [[Fijian chief, businessman, and  chairman- Kadavu Provincial Council.
 Ratu Veremalua Vugakoto - Flying Fijians (15's) member, (2019). 
 Richard Tanumi - Australian born - Musician, Actor, Singer, Model, Dancer
Rob Valetini -  Wallabies team member - (July 2019). First-Youngest Fijian schoolboy to be drafted into a rugby club Brumbies at age 16.
 Roy Ravana - sports personality, was one of Fiji's star athlete.
 Ratu Seci Nawalowalo- former Member of Parliament
 Ratu Sela Nanovo - Former Fijian Senator, named by the Great Council of Chiefs
 Dr. Sitiveni Ratuva - Professor in the Department of Sociology and Anthropology and director of the MacMillan Brown Centre for Pacific Studies at the University of Canterbury, New Zealand.
 Dr Tim. Uluirewa - first Fijian to attain a PhD degree in music. Former pastor, songwriter, and worship leader.
Saiyasi Fuli - first coach ever to successfully lead a women's team to  Olympic glory. The Fijiana 7s team made history by winning bronze at the 2021 Tokyo Olympics. Fuli is the current acting coach for the men's 7s team.
Sakeasi Nawaikama Waqanivavalagi, former Fijian politician, served as a minister in Ratu Kamisese Mara's cabinet, worked for the Order Of St John for 42 years and was its chairman, founding father of Fiji's National Provident Fund, a government minister, chairman of the Fiji Visitors Bureau and chairman of the Public Service Commission.
 Sera Tikotikovatu - first Fijian actress to act in an international TV series. Former Miss Hibiscus queen. She starred as Kirra in Pirate Islands: The Lost Treasure of Fiji''.
 Sevu Reece -  All Blacks Member - July 2019, 'Super Rugby 2019 Top try scorer', 'Crusaders Rookie of the year 2019.'
 Sireli Naqelevuki - first Fijian and first South Pacific Islander to be contracted to a South African franchise team, Stormers in Super Rugby.
 Solomoni Mara - ambassador to the USA and the UK.
 Terio Tamani - Captain of "Gold" medal winning 7's team (SPG -2019), member of Fiji 7's team.
 Vilisoni Rarasea - Sports personality, one of Fiji's star athletes, brother of Elenoa Sailosi.
 Vilimoni Vaganalau Labailagi - Butler to many of Fiji's Governor Generals, PM's and Presidents. Fiji's longest serving civil servant of more than 50 years.
 Waisea Vatuwaqa - musician and songwriter 
Grace Marie Baro - athlete Coca - Cola games 2019
 Malakai Waqanokonoko - developed plant maintenance studies at Fiji National University
 Ratu Majia Bainivalu - Turaga na Vunisalevu na Tui Naceva and Respected member of the Boselevu Vakaturaga
 Eremasi Vuki- Vatukoula Gold Mine Geology Sampler
 William Tabuya - former TV personality

References
 Sofer, Michael (2009) Twenty Years of Change in the Fijian Periphery: The Case of the Kadavu Island, Fiji, Singapore Journal of Tropical Geography, Vol. 30, pp. 343–357.
 Sofer, Michael (2015) Kadavu Island: Adaptation and stagnation in the Fijian periphery, Miscellanea Geographica: Regional Studies on Development, Vol. 19(2), pp. 14–20.

Specific

 
Provinces of Fiji